Asma Nabeel (1970s – 1 July 2021) was a Pakistani screenwriter, poet, producer and creative consultant. She wrote scripts for Pakistani dramas such as Khuda Mera Bhi Hai and Khaani.

Education 
She had a Master's in Mass Communication from University of Karachi 2000.

Career

Creative consultant 
Asma worked as an advertising consultant in many companies. She remained a creative director at JWT for four years. She also remained a creative head at ORIENTM. Asma later became a Chief creative officer at Walter Pakistan.

Screenwriter 
Asma made her debut into screenwriting when diagnosed with breast cancer, after which she had to undergo several chemotherapy sessions. In these sessions, Asma wanted to spend more time with herself, so she started writing one-liners. One day, Asma ran into Sana Shahnawaz; a new producer with whom she collaborated to produce the screenplay, Khuda Mera Bhi Hai. Asma wrote a 26-episode series which was produced by Sana Shahnawaz into the play. The drama raised the issue of tolerance and acceptance of unisex children in society. It was aired on ARY Digital and starred Ayesha Khan and Syed Jibran as lead actors.

Asma wrote the TV series Khaani for Seventh Sky Entertainment which became a popular series and outranked many other drama serials running at the time. It starred Feroze Khan and Sana Javed as the lead actors. The drama received six nominations at the Lux Style Awards 2019.

In 2018, she wrote the hit movie Maan Jao Naa with Ahsan Raza Firdousi. The movie is a romantic comedy.

Asma was known for writing content that highlights social issues. In 2019 Asma wrote the drama Damsa, a series about child abductions. Her drama series Surkh Chandni also touched a social topic of acid attacks. The story revolved around an acid attack victim played by Sohai Ali Abro. Asma's drama serial Baandi highlighted the topic of ill treatment of maids in Pakistan.

Asma was also the COO of Crew motion pictures, a production house that produced many of Asma's projects.

Poet 
Asma made her debut in Bollywood by writing lyrics for a song featured in Helicopter Eela, starring Kajol. The song was performed by Shilpa Rao. Asma previously worked with Helicopter Eela director Pradeep Sarkar on a few commercials when she was in advertising. Pradeep liked Asma's writing, and so he ended up contacting Asma to write a song for his movie.

While writing dramas, Asma was urged to publish a book. At the time, she wanted to write Urdu poetry. When Asma went to London in 2018, she met Beo Zafar who introduced Asma to her English poetry book A Dreamer Awakes. During her meeting, Beo had told Asma that she wanted someone to translate her poetry into Urdu. Asma then took permission from Beo to translate the poetry. The translated work was published by Asma under the name Beydaari.

Social work 
Asma was involved in projects that highlight social issues. Asma was working on a new project Fly. Fly is a movie revolving around breast cancer and it will cast Hajra Yamin and Wahaj Ali as the lead roles. She revealed that the film will be directed by Misbaa Khalid. The production design will be done by Beenish and music will be produced by Schumaila Hussain. In an interview, Asma called her project a “long journey for a cause that’s very close to my heart”. She further said “It’s a film from the females of Pakistan for the females of Pakistan.”

Asma was also a speaker on many social issues. She ran polio awareness campaigns and breast cancer testing. She often spoke about breast cancer awareness and worked towards removing the taboo around it.

Asma collaborated with Sadia Jabbar to create a show Beautiful confessions with Asma Nabeel. The show had Asma as the host. The show aims to bring unheard stories of women that are unheard of in the society. The show was launched on women's day.

Awards 
Asma Nabeel was named Pond's Miracle woman in 2015.

She was nominated as Best Writer at the Lux Style Awards (2019) and Hum Style Awards (2019).

Filmography

Television
 Khaani
 Khuda Mera Bhi Hai
 Baandi
 Surkh Chandni
 Damsa
 Pinjra

Films
 Maan Jao Naa

References

External links 
 
 Asma Nabeel

1970s births
2021 deaths
Pakistani screenwriters
Women screenwriters
University of Karachi alumni
Place of birth missing
21st-century screenwriters
21st-century Pakistani women writers
Deaths from cancer in Pakistan
Pakistani television writers
Women television writers